The Men's 10,000 metres event at the 2003 Pan American Games took place on Thursday August 7, 2003.

Medalists

Records

Results

See also
2003 World Championships in Athletics – Men's 10,000 metres
Athletics at the 2004 Summer Olympics – Men's 10000 metres

References
Results

10,000 metres, Men's
2003